Enzo Maximiliano Kalinski Martínez (born 10 March 1987 in Santiago del Estero, Argentina), known as Enzo Kalinski, is an Argentine professional footballer who plays for Central Córdoba SdE.

Honours
San Lorenzo
 Argentine Primera División: 2013 Inicial
 Copa Libertadores: 2014
 Supercopa Argentina: 2015

Universidad Catolica
 Chilean Primera División: Apertura 2016-17
 Supercopa de Chile: 2016

External links
 
 
 

1987 births
Living people
Argentine footballers
Argentine expatriate footballers
Argentine people of Polish descent
Association football midfielders
Central Córdoba de Santiago del Estero footballers
Quilmes Atlético Club footballers
San Lorenzo de Almagro footballers
Club Deportivo Universidad Católica footballers
Club Tijuana footballers
Club Atlético Banfield footballers
Estudiantes de La Plata footballers
Argentinos Juniors footballers
Chilean Primera División players
Primera Nacional players
Argentine Primera División players
Liga MX players
Argentine expatriate sportspeople in Chile
Argentine expatriate sportspeople in Mexico
Expatriate footballers in Chile
Expatriate footballers in Mexico
People from Santiago del Estero
Sportspeople from Santiago del Estero Province